Advanced Chemistry Development, Inc., (ACD/Labs) specializes in the design of software, with a focus on the R&D and chemistry of molecules ('small molecules'). ACD/Labs provides solutions for the enterprise in varied areas, including analytical data handling and knowledge management; in addition, molecular property modelling and property-based design are relevant areas of expertise in ACD Labs.

Location
The company is headquartered in Toronto, Ontario, Canada with direct sales offices in the UK, Germany, France, China, and India. The distribution channel extends throughout Europe to Australia, S. America, and Africa.

History
ACD/Labs was founded in 1994 as a private company. The intention was to monetize the experience of an international team of scientists specializing in quantitative structure-property relationships, such as NMR spectra and various physico-chemical properties, such as pKa, logP, logD, boiling point, vapor pressure. Early on the development focused on predictors, chemical drawing and chemical naming. But by 1997 the scope expanded to also include chromatography, processing of optical and mass spectra and databasing.

Pharma Algorithms was established in 2001. Its team focused solely on quantitative property prediction, but employed wider array of methods and applied them not only to physico-chemical properties, but also to such areas as ADME, toxicity, reactivity.

In 2009 the companies merged under the name ACD/Labs. This allowed to combine ACD's expertise at spectra processing and some of its more tried-and-true prediction algorithms with Pharma's expertise at building user-friendly GUI and predicting biochemical properties as well as their more flexible prediction engine. The merger marked a shift from "shrink-wrap software" oriented on individual research specialists toward comprehensive solutions that would integrate ACD products into an infrastructure of a client company.

Customers
ACD/Labs solutions are used by a variety of industries including pharma/biotech, fine chemicals, consumer goods, agrochemicals, petrochemicals, food and beverage, academic institutions, and government organizations.

See also
International Union of Pure and Applied Chemistry
Computer-Assisted Drug Design
QSAR
Structural Elucidation
Scientific Data Management System
Analytical Chemistry
Instrumental chemistry

References

Comparison of pKa prediction accuracy among 9 in silico predictors.

Science software